Artur Mikaelyan (born March 8, 1970, in Kirovakan, Armenian SSR) is an Armenian–Greek amateur boxer.

Mikaelyan won a bronze medal at the 1995 World Amateur Boxing Championships in the bantamweight division. In 1997, he moved to Greece and competed for the country at the 2000 Summer Olympics.

He also won a bronze medal at the 2001 Mediterranean Games and a gold medal at the 2002 Acropolis Cup.

References

1970 births
Living people
People from Vanadzor
Bantamweight boxers
Greek male boxers
Olympic boxers of Greece
Boxers at the 2000 Summer Olympics
Greek people of Armenian descent
Armenian male boxers
AIBA World Boxing Championships medalists

Mediterranean Games bronze medalists for Greece
Competitors at the 2001 Mediterranean Games
Mediterranean Games medalists in boxing